{{DISPLAYTITLE:C27H34F2O7}}
The molecular formula C27H34F2O7 (molar mass: 508.55 g/mol, exact mass: 508.2273 u) may refer to:

 Difluprednate
 Procinonide